Tropical Storm Tasha may refer to:

Western Pacific Ocean:
 Tropical Storm Tasha (1990)
 Typhoon Tasha (1993)

Australian Region:
 Cyclone Tasha – a weak tropical cyclone that was short-lived but exacerbated widespread floods in Queensland, Australia, causing devastation.

Pacific typhoon set index articles